Concepción is a municipality of Santander, Colombia. It belongs to the García Rovira Province.

History 
It was founded in 1722 by Pedro Manuel Angarita and José Manuel Cáceres Enciso. It was capital of the province of García Rovira.

Geography 

It is located on flat, cleared terrain, and has temperatures around 18 °C. The municipality occupies 686 km2, and is bordered by Cerrito in the north; Carcasí, Enciso and Málaga in the south; Boyacá in the east; and Saint Andrés in the west.

The territory of the municipality is crossed by the Servitá and Sartanejo rivers.

Demography 
The municipality has 7,133 inhabitants, of which 2,508 live in the urban area and 4.625 in rural areas. It is one of the few municipalities of Santander that has pertaining inhabitants to the native community of the Uwas.

Economy and tourism 
Concepción is the wool production capital of Colombia and has several small factories dedicated to the production wool related products. The fairs of the village focus  mainly on exhibitions Sheep, Graziers, Equidae and of wool products, in addition to handmade products. The inhabitants of the village also engage in agriculture, mainly barley, wheat, potato, corn, beans, blackberry and curuba.

On December 8 the celebration in honor of the patron of the municipality, the Virgin of Inmaculada Concepción, is held. Delegations from colonies of different cities of the country return to this beautiful land, full of human heat and hospitality.

References 

 Revisder Santander 21st century. Publishing Visual Colour. 2003.

External links 
 Official page of Concepción

Municipalities of Santander Department
Populated places established in 1720
1720 establishments in the Spanish Empire